Florence Mary MacBeth (January 12, 1889 – May 5, 1966) was an American operatic soprano.

Biography
MacBeth was born in Mankato, Minnesota. She sang in opera abroad and with the Chicago Opera Association, as well as in the Mozart operas given by the Society of American Musicians in New York in 1918. She was one of the organizers of the Los Angeles Opera Guild.

Macbeth was married to James M. Cain, American author and journalist.

She shares a name with singer of English/Canadian band The Revolving Doors of London, Florence (Flossie) Macbeth.

References

External links

1880s births
1966 deaths
American operatic sopranos
20th-century American women opera singers
Singers from Chicago
Singers from Los Angeles
Classical musicians from California
Classical musicians from Illinois